His House is a 2020 horror thriller film written and directed by Remi Weekes from a story by Felicity Evans and Toby Venables. It stars Wunmi Mosaku, Sope Dirisu and Matt Smith. The film tells the story of a refugee couple from South Sudan, struggling to adjust to their new life in an English town that has an evil lurking beneath the surface.

It had its world premiere at the Sundance Film Festival on 27 January 2020. It was released on 30 October 2020, by Netflix and received widespread acclaim from critics.

Plot 
Bol and Rial are refugees fleeing with their daughter, Nyagak, from war-torn South Sudan. They brave stormy waters on an overcrowded motorboat, along with fellow refugees traversing the perilous English Channel from France in search of a better life. Although they survive the treacherous crossing, their daughter and many others do not. When they are finally granted probational asylum in Britain three months later, the government assigns them a shabby house with peeling walls and dismal furnishings on the outskirts of London. They are given strict restrictions or they may face deportation. They experience racism and hatred from their tenement neighbours. They are met by their case worker Mark, who tells them he hopes they are two of "the good ones."

Bol tries to assimilate: he sings football songs, asks Rial to use utensils rather than her hands when they eat, and even changes how he dresses. Bol wants to prove to the government that he and Rial belong in the UK. Rial, however, clings to their culture. She retains their daughter's necklace, dresses in colourful clothes, and rather than using a table, sits on the floor to eat. Bol and Rial soon experience strange phenomena in their new home and see visions of Nyagak and a mysterious man, who both escape into the walls.

Rial figures out that the evil in the house is an apeth or "night witch." She tells Bol the story of a poor man in her village who accidentally stole from an apeth by the river. When the thief built his home, the apeth moved in with him and haunted him. Rial believes that an apeth has followed them and if they repay their debt, the apeth will bring Nyagak back to them. However it is not immediately clear what the "debt" is. Bol burns everything they brought with them, but the apeth continues to torment him and the couple's relationship deteriorates. He goes to Mark and requests new accommodation under the guise that their unit is infested with rats, but is unable to convince him. Bol tears apart the house looking for the apeth, which threatens the couple's chances of staying in the UK when Mark discovers the damage. Rial tells Bol that she wants to leave. Bol locks Rial in the house and summons the apeth himself, who calls him a thief and claiming that Bol has stolen a life that was not his to take. The apeth offers Bol a deal: his life for Nyagak's, but he refuses this offer, resulting in Bol being forced into a state of catatonia.

Rial escapes the house but finds herself inexplicably back in South Sudan in a familiar classroom. She is reunited with old friends, who are revealed in a further flashback to be victims of a horrendous massacre. Rial was able to survive by hiding. Bol finds her and they escape as violence grips the region, but find that a bus they need to board would only let people with children on. Desperate, Bol sees Nyagak in the crowd and abducts her, falsely claiming that she is their daughter.  The couple get on the bus and escape, leaving Nyagak's real mother behind as gunfire erupts. Later, when crossing the rough sea, Nyagak and others fall overboard. Neither Bol nor Rial reaches her in time. Having accepted what they did, Bol decides to repay the debt to the apeth and tells Rial. Bol starts to let the apeth into his skin and Nyagak enters the room and returns to Rial. Rial chooses to save Bol instead of accepting this alternative reality, by slitting the apeth's throat.

Later, Mark comes to inspect the house to find it repaired. Bol and Rial tell him they have chosen to stay and make it their new home. They say Rial killed the witch that haunted them, which Mark finds funny.  Bol says they decided to live with the ghosts of their past from South Sudan, including Nyagak.

Cast
 Wunmi Mosaku as Rial
 Sope Dirisu as Bol
 Matt Smith as Mark
 Javier Botet (on-set) and Cornell John (voice) as the Apeth
 Emily Taaffe as Dr. Hayes
 Malaika Abigaba as Nyagak
 Dominic Coleman as the lead immigration officer

Production
His House was developed by British production company Starchild Pictures run by producers Ed King and Martin Gentles. In August 2017, it was announced that Remi Weekes would direct the film from a screenplay he wrote. The Weinstein Company filed a lawsuit against Starchild Pictures claiming they had backed out of an unsigned distribution agreement. In March 2018, it was announced Wunmi Mosaku, Sope Dirisu had joined the cast of the film, with the lawsuit not proceeding and The Weinstein Company no longer attached. New Regency Pictures, BBC Films and Vertigo Entertainment were set to finance and produce. In May 2018, Matt Smith joined the cast of the film.

Release
It had its world premiere at the Sundance Film Festival on 27 January 2020. Netflix acquired distribution rights to the film. It was released on 30 October 2020.

Reception
The website's critics consensus reads, "Featuring genuine scares through every corridor, His House is a terrifying look at the specters of the refugee experience and a stunning feature debut for Remi Weekes." On Metacritic, it has a score of 72/100 based on reviews from 19 critics, indicating "generally favorable reviews".

Writing for Rolling Stone, K. Austin Collins gave the film a score of 3.5/5 stars, writing that the film is "a strong debut, and exciting -- even as its horrors risk redundancy as the film wears on -- for its uncanny merging of political experience and the usual, perilous haunted-house thrills." Justin Chang of the Los Angeles Times described the film as "one of those return-of-the-repressed freakouts in which suspense and social conscience effectively breathe as one", and added: "it’s a calculated mix of migrant drama and B-movie thrills that can feel reminiscent of movies as different as Jacques Audiard’s Dheepan and especially Romola Garai’s Amulet".

Accolades

References

External links
 
 

2020 films
2020 horror thriller films
American horror thriller films
American supernatural horror films
BBC Film films
British horror thriller films
British supernatural horror films
2020s ghost films
Demons in film
2020s English-language films
English-language Netflix original films
Films scored by Roque Baños
Films set in London
Refugees and displaced people in fiction
Regency Enterprises films
Films produced by Roy Lee
Vertigo Entertainment films
American ghost films
British ghost films
Films produced by Arnon Milchan
2020s American films
2020s British films
Dinka-language films
2020 multilingual films
American multilingual films
British multilingual films